Henry Vane is the name of:
Sir Henry Vane the Elder (1589–1655), English courtier, father of Henry Vane the Younger
Sir Henry Vane the Younger (1613–1662), statesman, Puritan, son of Henry Vane the Elder
Henry Vane, 1st Earl of Darlington (1705–1758), PC (c. )
Henry Vane, 2nd Earl of Darlington (1726–1792), British peer
Henry Vane-Tempest (1771–1813), to 1793 known as Henry Vane
Henry Vane, 2nd Duke of Cleveland (1788–1864), British peer, politician and army officer
Henry Vane, 9th Baron Barnard (1854–1918), British peer and Senior Freemason
Henry Francis Cecil Vane (born 1959)
John Vane, 11th Baron Barnard (1923–2016), full name Henry John Vane
Henry Cecil Vane (1882–1917), son and heir apparent of Henry de Vere Vane, 9th Baron Barnard of Raby Castle

See also
Vane (surname)
Henry Vane-Tempest (1771–1813), British politician